Rubén Ramírez Hidalgo and Santiago Ventura were the defending champions; however, they lost to Pablo Andújar and Iván Navarro in the first round.
Ilija Bozoljac and Daniele Bracciali won in the final 6–4, 6–4, against Oleksandr Dolgopolov Jr. and Dmitri Sitak.

Seeds

Draw

Draw

External links
 Doubles draw

2010 Doubles
Rabat,Doubles